Maria Alice Rodrigues Vera Cruz de Carvalho (born 1955) is a Santomean jurist who served as President of the country's Supreme Court from 2001.

Cruz was educated in Brazil and became a student of Gilmar Mendes, president of the Supreme Federal Court. She practiced law in Brazil and Portugal.

Cruz was elected president of the Supreme Court of São Tomé and Príncipe in May 2011, making her the first woman to hold the position. In January 2003, Cruz and Prime Minister Maria das Neves successfully mediated a solution after President Fradique de Menezes dissolved the National Assembly.

On 21 November 2008, Cruz was a signatory to the Declaration constituting the Conference of Constitutional Jurisdictions of the Portuguese-Speaking Countries. As of 2017, she remains a justice on the Supreme Court.

References

1955 births
São Tomé and Príncipe women lawyers
Women chief justices
Living people